The 1963–64 Yugoslav Ice Hockey League season was the 22nd season of the Yugoslav Ice Hockey League, the top level of ice hockey in Yugoslavia. Eight teams participated in the league, and Jesenice have won the championship.

Regular season

External links
 Season on hrhockey

Yugo
Yugoslav Ice Hockey League seasons
1963–64 in Yugoslav ice hockey